"Right Now" is a song by Australian rapper Allday, released on 25 April 2014 as the lead single from the Allday's debut studio album Startup Cult. The single peaked at number 69 on the ARIA Chart was certified gold in Australia in 2021.

Music video
The Music video was released in May 2014 which Sam Price of Speaker TV thought "[the] touches of visual elegance softening the blow in the newly christened offering."

Track listing
Digital download
 "Right Now" – 3:57

Charts

Certifications

References

Allday songs
2014 songs
2014 singles
Songs written by Allday